Chester Earl Clem, Jr. (born December 28, 1937) was an American politician in the state of Florida.

Clem was born in Sanford, Florida. He attended the University of Florida and was admitted to the Florida bar in 1963. He served in the Florida House of Representatives for the 48th district from 1972 to 1976, as a Republican. He ran for Governor of Florida in 1986, but came in fourth place in the Republican primary.

References

Living people
1937 births
Republican Party members of the Florida House of Representatives